The FluChip is a low-density DNA microarray for the identification of influenza viruses, originally developed at the University of Colorado at Boulder in the laboratory of Professor Kathy Rowlen in collaboration with the Centers for Disease Control and Prevention (CDC) in Atlanta.

The project was funded in 2003 by the National Institute of Allergy and Infectious Diseases (NIAID), part of the National Institutes of Health.
The original FluChip 
was designed to detect both influenza A and B viruses utilizing three gene targets: the HA (Hemagglutinin), NA (Neuraminidase), and M (matrix) gene segments.  Numerous short DNA capture sequences were designed, and used to both type and subtype influenza A viruses by taking advantage of genetic similarities and differences.  The overall assay consisted of RT-PCR amplification of influenza RNA, subsequent runoff transcription using the PCR product as template, and hybridization of fluorescently-labeled fragmented RNA to the microarray surface.   The overall pattern of fluorescence intensities were utilized to type and subtype the influenza virus(es) present.

MChip

various influenza A subtypes.

When it was discovered that the M gene segment alone contained enough genetic diversity between subtypes to provide subtype information, subsequent work focused on exploring this as a subtyping assay for influenza A (‘MChip’).   MChip was utilized to examine hundreds of specimens, focusing on the ability to discriminate human H1N1, human H3N2, and avian influenza (H5N1) subtypes, and resulted in high clinical sensitivity and specificity as detailed in several published studies.

Other influenza A viruses of interest that have been recently examined with MChip are the 1918 ‘Spanish flu’ strain,

and a variety of pandemic H1N1/09 virus specimens.

InDevR Inc. (Boulder, CO) licensed the FluChip technology from the University of Colorado and CDC in 2009,

and is developing the application for use in a forthcoming molecular diagnostics platform.

References

External links
InDevR Website
 Flu Chip May Help Combat Future Epidemics, Pandemics
 FluChip / MChip: Rapid Identification of Influenza A Viruses using a Single-Gene DNA Microarray
 FluChip can spot bird flu in under 12 hours
 CDC Unveils the FluChip

Microarrays